The Siberian large-toothed shrew (Sorex daphaenodon) is a species of shrew. This species is found across Northeast Asia, from Mongolia through northeastern China to the Russian Far East and the Paektusan region of North Korea.

References

External links
Zipcode Zoo

Sorex
Mammals of Korea
Mammals of Russia
Mammals described in 1907
Taxa named by Oldfield Thomas
Mammals of Mongolia